The French Classic Races are a series of Group One Thoroughbred horse races run annually on the flat. The races were instituted in the nineteenth century, taking 
the British Classic Races as a model.

In the original scheme, one race, the Poule d'Essai, served as the equivalent to the first two British classics, but was later divided into separate races for colts and fillies. The Grand Prix de Paris, for many years the most important and valuable of the French classics, had no British equivalent.

The Prix Royal-Oak was opened to older horses in 1979, making it no longer a direct parallel to the St. Leger, which remains open only to three-year-olds, and is similar to the fourth leg of the United States' Grand Slam, the Breeders' Cup Classic, first run in 1984. It distanced itself further from the St. Leger parallel in 1986, when it opened to geldings, becoming the only classic race in either France or Great Britain in which geldings are allowed to run. (Note that in several other major racing regions, notably North America and Australia, geldings are allowed to run in any race open to intact males if they are otherwise qualified to enter.)

References

 French Classic Races